Japan Canada Oil Sands Limited (JACOS) was an oil sands extraction company. It was the operator of the Hangingstone oil sands project. JACOS was acquired by Greenfire Resources Operating Corporation in 2021.

History
JACOS started oil sands activities in the Athabasca area in 1978 on leases held by Petro-Canada, Canadian Occidental (Nexen) and Imperial Oil to form the PCEJ group.  It was the first Asian-owned oil company to exploit the Athabasca oil sands.  JACOS and its partners experimented with a cyclic steam stimulation (CSS) pilot project on the Hangingstone Lease from 1984 to 1994.

In 1992, JACOS parent company JAPEX participated in the Alberta Oil Sands Technology and Research Authority (AOSTRA) steam-assisted gravity drainage (SAGD) pilot experiments at the underground test facility (UTF) site.  With the positive results from the UTF project, JACOS decided to further pursue SAGD technology at the Hangingstone site.  A 3-phase demonstration project was designed and constructed with the first phase becoming operational in 1999.

In 2021, JACOS was acquired by Greenfire Resources Operating Corporation (GROC) which is backed by McIntyre Partners and Griffon Partners.

Operations 
GROC currently operates the Hangingstone Expansion Project as well as the Hangingstone Demonstration Project.

See also 
Tar sands
History of the petroleum industry in Canada (oil sands and heavy oil)

References

Oil companies of Canada
Athabasca oil sands
Petroleum industry in Canada
Companies based in Calgary